Park Yo-han (born 16 January 1989) is a South Korean footballer who plays as a full back. He currently plays for Suwon FC.

External links 

1989 births
Living people
Association football defenders
South Korean footballers
Gwangju FC players
Chungju Hummel FC players
Asan Mugunghwa FC players
Suwon FC players
K League 1 players
K League 2 players
Yonsei University alumni